Aghagallon is a small village and civil parish in County Antrim, Northern Ireland. It is about three miles northeast of Lurgan and had a population of 824 in the 2001 Census.

Aghagallon has mainly developed along Aghalee Road in a linear fashion with development to the southeast along Colane Road. St Patrick's Church and the adjacent primary school are in the middle of the village. Although the village is named after the townland of Aghagallon, it lies almost wholly within neighbouring Derrynaseer townland.

Townlands of Aghagallon Parish

The parish of Aghagallon consists of 13 townlands; Aghadrumglasny, Aghagallon, Ballycairn, Ballykeel, Ballymacilrany, Derryclone, Derryhirk, Derrymore, Derrynaseer, Drumaleet, Montiaghs, Tamnyvane, and Tiscallen,

The Three Pronged Revolver
An incident that took place in Aghagallon in 1790 became known as "The Battle of Annaghdroghal Bridge". A group of Protestant men from the nearby village of Waringstown, accompanied by flute and drum and under the command of Colonel Sharp, marched from Waringstown at the request of Lord Waring to plough and prepare a field in Aghagallon for a friend and fellow English landowner and Orangeman. Their journey from Waringstown to Aghagallon was a controversial one, with several incidents occurring along the way in the town of Lurgan.

As Col. Sharp and his men reached the Annaghdroghal Bridge just east of Aghagallon they were met by local men who refused them passage. A fight occurred and the Battle of Annaghdroghal began. Col. Sharp led his men in the first attack and was fatally wounded by "The Darkie" McStravick, receiving a chest wound from a three-pronged muck fork. McStravick fled the scene and dumped the fork ("The Three Pronged Revolver") down a dry well at Derryclone. According to rumour, Darkie Mcstravick had lived in Derryclone, which is why he fled there to dispose of the "Three Pronged Revolver". The fork was retrieved around 1890 from the well and was presented to a local museum by Phelim McStravick in 2008.

Education 
The village has two primary schools, St Patrick's Primary School (Aghagallon) and St Mary's Primary School (Derrymore).

2001 Census 
Aghagallon is classified as a small village or hamlet by the NI Statistics and Research Agency (NISRA) (i.e. with population between 500 and 1,000 people).

On census day (29 April 2001) there were 824 people living in Aghagallon village. Of these:
32.3% were aged under 16 and 11.7% were aged 60 and over
50.2% of the population were male and 49.8% were female
96.6% were from a Catholic background and 3.0% were from a Protestant background;
3.2% of people aged 16–74 were unemployed.

In the 2001 census the resident population of Aghagallon Ward was 3,806 (including the village), of whom:
29.3% were under 16 years old and 13.6% were aged 60 and over;
50.5% of the population were male and 49.5% were female;
85.5% were from a Catholic community background and 12.6% were from a 'Protestant and Other Christian (including Christian related)' community background;
30.3% of persons aged 16 and over were single (never married);
32.5 years was the average age of the population; and
the population density was 0.4 persons per hectare.
 
The population for the civil parish of Aghagallon in 2010 was estimated at 4,586, of which 25.4% were children, 32.1% were young working age adults, 29.9% were older working age adults and 12.6% were older people. Young working age adults are defined as 16- to 39-year-olds, and older working age adults as males 40–64 and females 40–59 years. This represents an increase of 20.1% (768 individuals) from the estimated mid-year ward population in 2001.

The Farm Census 2010 recorded 89 farms registered to addresses in Aghagallon, and the total agricultural labour force was 170 persons.

Sport 
Aghagallon has one Gaelic Athletic Association (GAA) club, Naomh Mhuire, which serves the areas of Aghagallon village, Gawley's Gate and Ballinderry after clubs in these areas folded over the years. They currently play in Division 2 of the Antrim All-County League and have a recently constructed playing field located on the Colane Road. Although the club is part of Antrim GAA, it has links to Armagh and fields some teams in the North Armagh leagues. Aghagallon competes in the Antrim Intermediate Football Championship, having won promotion from the Junior ranks in 2002. After a few seasons in the Senior Championship, the club will again compete in the IFC, against opposition such as Moneyglass, Rossa and St Enda's. The Senior Gaelic team is sponsored by Hannon Transport.

The local soccer team, Aghagallon Magners, are current holders of the winter league cup and are sponsored by the Derryhirk Inn.

People
Notable people who have lived in or been associated with the area include:

Breandán Mac Cionnaith, Irish republican activist
Marc Wilson, footballer
Shayne Lavery, footballer

Fionnuala Ross, Marathon runner

See also
List of civil parishes in County Antrim

References

Villages in County Antrim
Civil parishes of County Antrim